When a group of atoms is super-cooled to temperatures near absolute zero,  they form a Bose–Einstein condensate, a state of matter where quantum effects can be observed in the macroscopic system. In this state, the trajectories of the atoms can be manipulated using light.

If a super-cooled atomic gas is placed in a standing light wave produced by two counter-propagating lasers of certain frequency, the atoms are diffracted in different order. Here  is the magnitude of the wave vector of the laser. This is called two-photon recoil process. In such situation, a BEC cloud sitting at the center of a trap is split into two identical clouds. The clouds then travel in opposite directions with a velocity,  in the direction of the photon.

References

Atoms